Bobby Jack Fowler (June 12, 1939 – May 20, 2006) was an American rapist and suspected serial killer who was active in the United States and Canada from 1973-1995. He died in prison of lung cancer during a 16-year sentence following a conviction for rape, kidnapping and attempted rape in Newport, Oregon, in 1996 (for an attack that took place in 1995).

Biography and early life

Childhood 
Bobby Jack Fowler was born June 12, 1939 to Selva “Mutt” Fowler and Oma Lee (Hathaway) Fowler, he was their second born son, his older brother Walter Fowler was born in 1934 and his younger sister Susan Fowler was born in 1950, both died in 2004, two years before his death. His parents beat him and his siblings, when they were kids.

Marriage 

On March 6, 1959, Fowler married Theresa Patton, and their kids were Johnny, Janey, Pam, Loretta and Randell. After his two arrests in 1969 (which are mentioned below) he and Theresa divorced on May 17, 1971, just before he moved to British Colombia.

Known crimes and modus operandi

Fowler was a transient construction worker who is known to have traveled extensively across North America. He spent time "rabbiting around" North America to such places as British Columbia, Florida, Iowa, Louisiana, Texas, Oregon, South Carolina, Arizona, Tennessee and Washington state. During his travels he developed an extensive criminal record and is known to have committed several violent crimes. An alcohol, amphetamine, and methamphetamine abuser, Fowler had a criminal record that included attempted murder, sexual assault, and firearms offenses.

In 1969, he was charged with murdering a man and woman in Texas, but was only convicted of discharging a firearm within city limits. Fowler also spent time in a Tennessee prison for sexual assault and attempted murder because, in the words of an investigator, "he tied [a woman] up, beat the hell out of her with her own belt, covered her with brush and left her to die."

He liked to travel far and wide in beat-up old cars, frequently picked up hitchhikers, and spent time in bars and motels. Fowler believed that women he came into contact with who were hitchhiking and hanging out in bars wanted to be sexually assaulted.

Suspected crimes
Fowler is a suspect or person of interest in at least 16 murders in British Columbia and Oregon dating as far back as 1969.

Project E-Pana

Fowler was a suspect under the focus of RCMP project E-Pana. His supposed DNA was found on the body of Colleen MacMillen. Fowler is also strongly suspected to have killed both Gale Weys and Pamela Darlington in 1973. The Royal Canadian Mounted Police believe that he may have also killed as many as ten of the other victims, and possibly as many as 20.

Potential Canadian victims include those murdered and missing along the Highway of Tears.  However, many of these murders occurred after Fowler's imprisonment in 1996 and geographic profiler Kim Rossmo is on the record as saying that in his opinion Fowler is not responsible for any of the deaths along Highway 16 between 1989 and 2006.  It is possible that the only thing linking Fowler to Highway 16 is that he worked for a now closed Prince George roofing company, Happy's Roofing, in 1974.

Other murders
On May 3, 1992, around 1:00 a.m., Sheila Swanson, 19, and Melissa Sanders, 17, were last seen making a call from a payphone near the Beverly Beach State Park where they had been camping. Their bodies were later discovered on October 10, 1992, by hunters in a wooded area near Eddyville, Oregon.

Arrest and investigation
On June 28, 1995, Fowler was arrested following an incident which involved a woman jumping out of a window in the Newport Oregon Tides Inn Motel with a rope still tied to her ankle. She survived the attack and reported her tale to the local police.

On January 8, 1996, Fowler was convicted of kidnapping in the first degree, attempted rape in the first degree, sexual abuse in the first degree, coercion, assault in the fourth degree, and menacing. He was sentenced to 195 months (16 years, 3 months) with the possibility of parole.

On September 25, 2012, the Royal Canadian Mounted Police and Lincoln County District Attorney Rob Bovett named Bobby Jack Fowler as a suspect in three of the E-Pana murders. His supposed DNA was found on the body of Colleen MacMillen, one of the presumed victims.

Death
In May 2006, Fowler died at the age of 66 in Oregon State Penitentiary from lung cancer. His body was cremated.

See also 
 List of serial killers in the United States

References

External links
Highway of Tears Symposium Recommendation Report

1939 births
2006 deaths
20th-century American criminals
American male criminals
American rapists
American people convicted of assault
American people convicted of attempted murder
American people convicted of attempted rape
American people convicted of kidnapping
American people who died in prison custody
Crimes in Oregon
Criminals from Texas
Deaths from cancer in Oregon
Deaths from lung cancer
Highway of Tears
People from Taylor County, Texas
Suspected serial killers
Prisoners who died in Oregon detention